Patrick Nnaemeka Okorie (born 27 May 1990), better known by his stage name Patoranking, is a Nigerian reggae-dancehall singer and songwriter. Born and raised in Ijegun-Egba Satellite Town, Patoranking hails from Onicha, Ebonyi State. He started his music career doing underground collaborations, with artists such as XProject, Konga, Slam and Reggie Rockstone. He signed a record deal with K-Solo's Igberaga Records in 2010, releasing "Up in D Club" under the outfit. Patoranking became a protégé of Dem Mama Records after collaborating with Timaya on his song "Alubarika". In February 2014, he signed a record deal with Foston Musik and released "Girlie O", a single that put him in the limelight. On 9 February 2015, Patoranking announced on Instagram that he signed a distribution deal with VP Records. on September 28 Patoranking released a song titled Abule which he released ahead of his album scheduled to be released later in 2020. He once said, in 2020 that he once got inspiration for song on a football pitch while playing football.

Life and music career
Patoranking was born and raised in Ijegun-Egba Satellite Town but has family roots in Onicha, Ebonyi State. He attended Citizen Comprehensive College in Epe, Lagos and later enrolled at Jibril Martin Memorial Grammar School in Iponri. Patoranking started his performing, arts career as a street jam and carnival dancer. In a 2012 interview with Entertainment Express, he said his stage name was given to him by a Jamaican artist whom he met at Alpha Beach in Lagos. Patoranking has cited Buju Banton, Bob Marley, Fela Kuti, Lucky Dube, Chaka Demus, Majek Fashek, Blackky, Blackface, Tuface and Marvelous Benjy as his key musical influences. In the aforementioned interview with Entertainment Express, he described his music as a morally inclined variation of dancehall and said it references socio-political issues.

In May 2012, Patoranking released a single titled "Iya Bisi", featuring Qdot and Kbaj. The Drumphase-produced song is a fusion of dancehall and fuji. Patoranking told Entertainment Express that Qdot and Kbaj helped compose the song by sharing ideas with him.

On 12 September 2013, Okorie released the audio and video for "Alubarika" simultaneously. The song literally translates to "God's Blessings" and features vocals from Timaya. The music video for "Alubarika" was shot by AJE Films and ran for 4 minutes and 16 seconds. According to an article posted by Victor Akande of The Nation, Patoranking described the song as a summary of his life as a musician and said it opened doors for him in terms of building a fan base and working with established musicians.

In February 2014, Patoranking signed a record deal with Foston Musik and ended his affiliations with Dem Mama Records. During an interview with Toolz on NdaniTV's The Juice, Timaya said Patoranking left his label and was never officially signed. On 4 February 2014, Patoranking released "Girlie O", a song produced by WizzyPro. The music video for the song was shot and directed in London by Moe Musa; it was released on 5 February 2014. In the music video, Patoranking liberates his next-door neighbor from domestic violence by expressing his innate feelings to her.

Foston Musik released the Tiwa Savage-assisted "Girlie O" (Remix) on 19 May 2014 to critical acclaim. It debuted at No. 9 on MTV Base's Official Naija Top 10 chart. Tiwa Savage told Ehiz of MTV Base she admires Patoranking's music and decided to reach out to him to do the remix. The music video for "Girlie O" (Remix) was also shot and directed in London by Moe Musa. Joey Akan of Pulse Nigeria said, "On the new remix, the basic winning elements were not discarded. They were retained and improved. The beat, chorus, and dynamism were held onto, and major work put into the lyrics."

Patoranking was featured on Seyi Shay's "Murda" single alongside Shaydee. The song was produced by Dokta Frabz and released on 1 April 2014. On 11 May 2014, the music video for "Murda" was uploaded onto Vevo. It was directed by Meji Alabi for JM Films.  Patoranking's "Daniella Whine" and "My Woman, My Everything" singles charted on MTV Base Official Naija Top 10 chart. The former debuted at No. 4 in May and topped the chart at No. 1 in June, while the latter "My Woman, My Everything" also appeared on the chart, peaking at No. 2.

Discography

Albums

Selected singles

2021
"Celebrate Me"
Guest appearances

2019 he did a song with Ugandan Luga flow rapper Fik Fameica that was well received in East Africa, He has collaborated with East African music heavy weights including Only You ft Jose Chameleon, Nyashinski and Diamond Platnumz

Awards and nominations

See also

 List of Nigerian musicians
 List of Igbo people
 List of people from Ebonyi State

References

Living people
1990 births
21st-century Nigerian male singers
Nigerian male singer-songwriters
Nigerian reggae musicians
Dancehall musicians
Igbo singers
The Headies winners
People from Ebonyi State